Anna Kochukova (born 2 December 2001) is a Russian chess Woman FIDE Master (2015).

Biography
Anna Kochukova was a student of Borisoglebsk Chess School. She has represented Russia at European Youth Chess Championships and World Youth Chess Championships. In 2015, in Poreč Anna Kochukova won European Youth Chess Championship in the U14 girls age group and became the Woman FIDE Master (WFM). In 2017, she won Russian Youth Chess Championship in the U17 girls age group.

References

External links

Anna Kochukova chess games at 365Chess.com

2001 births
Living people
Russian female chess players
Chess Woman FIDE Masters